Dezhgan Rural District is a rural district (dehestan) in the Central District of Bandar Lengeh County, Hormozgan Province, Iran. At the 2006 census, its population was 7,461, in 1,607 families. The rural district has 26 villages.

References 

Rural Districts of Hormozgan Province
Bandar Lengeh County